Naruo Township is a township in Yuanjiang Hani, Yi and Dai Autonomous County, Yunnan, China.

Etymology
"Naruo" is a Hani place name, which means "village".

Administrative division
As of 2016, the township is divided into one community and five villages: 
 Naruo
 Langshu
 Hashi
 Damang
 Zhujie
 Zhedang

Geography
The township is situated at the southeastern Yuanjiang Hani, Yi and Dai Autonomous County. It is bordered to the north by Yangjie Township, to the east by Lijiang Subdistrict, and to the south, southeast and west by Honghe County.

Economy
The local economy is primarily based upon agriculture. Commercial crops include sugarcane, tobacco, and tea.

Transportation
The township is connected to two highways: the National Highway G553 and the Yuanjiang–Manhao Expressway.

References

Bibliography

Divisions of Yuanjiang Hani, Yi and Dai Autonomous County